Albert Coenraadsz. Burgh (1593 – 24 December 1647) was a Dutch physician who was mayor of Amsterdam and a councillor in the Admiralty of Amsterdam.

Biography
Burgh was born into a rich brewer's family.  He studied medicine in Leiden in 1614 and became a doctor in 1618 in Amsterdam.  In the same year, after Johan van Oldenbarnevelts Fall and beheading, the Calvinist Burgh was appointed councilor by Reynier Pauw to replace the pro-Remonstrant Jacob Dircksz de Graeff in the Amsterdam city council. He changed his view within a couple of years, paying a fine for the famous Dutch poet Vondel. Vondel had gotten into trouble because of his play Palamedes, in which he was recalling the beheading of Oldenbarneveldt.  

Around 1624 Burgh became one of the managers of the Dutch West India Company and owned land on the New Jersey side opposite the river Delaware. In 1632 Albert Burgh sold his land in Rensselaerswyck, Albany, to the main investor Kiliaen van Rensselaer.

In 1638, as one of Amsterdam's four Burgemeesters, Albert Burgh offered Marie de' Medici a meal with rice, in those days very exotic and hardly known to Europeans. He sold her a famous silver rosary, captured in 1629 by Piet Hein in Brazil. In 1644 he became a manager of the Admiralty of Amsterdam.

During his lifetime he visited Moscovia twice (1629 and 1647), in order to improve trade relations. Both times he entered the country in Archangelsk. Burgh died on Christmas Eve in Novgorod. The corpse was returned to Amsterdam. Dirck Tulp, the son of the famous surgeon Nicolaes Tulp, who had accompanied him on his trip to Moscovia, married his daughter. In 1652 Fort Coenraadsburg on the Gold Coast was named after him.

Offspring
One of Albert Burgh's grandsons, also named Albert Burgh, was a Franciscan in Rome and argued with his former teacher Baruch Spinoza in a couple of curious and famous letters; another grandson of Albert Burgh was the mayor of Amsterdam Coenraad van Beuningen.

References

Sources
 Elias, J.E. (1903–1905, reprint 1963) De vroedschap van Amsterdam 1578-1795, two volumes.
 KNAW

External links
The governors of the civic guard, including Albert C. Burgh
 Fulfilling God’s Mission: The Two Worlds of Dominie Everardus Bogardus, 1607 ... by Willem Frijhoff
Spinoza to Albert Burgh They are not the same Albert Burgh!

1593 births
1647 deaths
17th-century Dutch physicians
Mayors of Amsterdam
Muiderkring
Administrators of the Dutch West India Company
Physicians from Amsterdam
Remonstrants
Dutch West India Company people from Amsterdam